The Magic Flame is a 1927 American silent drama film directed by Henry King, produced by Samuel Goldwyn, and based on the 1900 play Konig Harlekin by Rudolph Lothar. George Barnes was nominated at the 1st Academy Awards for Best Cinematography for his work in The Magic Flame, The Devil Dancer, and Sadie Thompson. The film promoted itself as the Romeo and Juliet of the circus upon its release.

This is now considered to be a lost film. The first five reels are rumored to exist at the George Eastman House, though this is disputed.

Cast 
 Ronald Colman as Tito the Clown
 Vilma Bánky as Bianca, the acrobat
 Agostino Borgato as The Ringmaster
 Gustav von Seyffertitz as The Chancellor
 Harvey Clark as The Aide
 Shirley Palmer as The Wife
 Cosmo Kyrle Bellew as The Husband
 George Davis as The Utility Man
 André Cheron as The Manager
 Vadim Uraneff as The Visitor
 Meurnier-Surcouf as Sword Swallower
 Raoul Paoli as Weight Thrower
 William Bakewell
 Lucille Ballart
 Austen Jewell

See also
List of lost films
List of incomplete or partially lost films

References

External links

Stills at silenthollywood.com

1927 films
1927 drama films
American silent feature films
American black-and-white films
Circus films
1920s English-language films
American films based on plays
Films directed by Henry King
Samuel Goldwyn Productions films
United Artists films
Silent American drama films
Films based on Romeo and Juliet
Films with screenplays by Bess Meredyth
1920s American films
Silent horror films